Ud i den kolde sne is a 1934 Danish comedy film directed by Lau Lauritzen Jr. and Alice O'Fredericks. It was Fredericks debut film as a director. The title means "Out in the cold snow" in English.

Cast
Mathilde Nielsen as Baronesse Caroline von Hessen / 'Bedstemor'
Hans W. Petersen as Baron Povl von Hessen
Ib Schønberg as Taxachauffør Peter Basse
Gerd Gjedved as Lotte Basse
Sigurd Langberg as Godejer Brun
Aase Clausen as Aase Brun
Ellen Jansø as Korpige Vera Vernonica
Arthur Jensen as Tjener Johan
Arne-Ole David as Dr. Nicols
Henry Nielsen as Mediet
Christian Schrøder as Den gamle chauffør
Carl Fischer as Foged
Clara Østø as Den fredgene pige
Alex Suhr as Direktør Hallenberg

References

External links

1934 films
1934 comedy films
1934 directorial debut films
1930s Danish-language films
Danish black-and-white films
Films directed by Lau Lauritzen Jr.
Films directed by Alice O'Fredericks
Danish comedy films